The Algerian three-toed skink (Chalcides mertensi) is a species of "grass-swimming" skink with an elongated serpentine shape and reduced limbs. It is endemic to north-western Africa.

Distribution
It is native to northern Algeria and northern Tunisia, where it occurs on the Mediterranean coast.

Habitat
The Algerian three-toed skink lives in forested areas in northern Algeria, and in semi-arid maquis-type habitats in Algeria and Tunisia. It prefers humid, sunny areas with dense vegetation within grassland, meadows, areas close to streams, hedges, open cork oak forest, and the edges of cultivated areas. It is also known from tall herbaceous grassland. The females give birth to formed young. It has been recorded from sea level up to 1,500 m above sea level.

Taxonomy
The Algerian three-toed skink was formerly considered to be as a subspecies of the Italian three-toed skink Chalcides chalcides, but it was raised to species status by Caputo (1993). It has further been proposed that as molecular studies identified different lineages of the Algerian three-toed skink from samples in the northern and southern parts of its range in Tunisia and suggest there are at least two species present but recommended further research. Another molecular study showed that this species was in a clade of Chalcides called the grass-swimming clade alongside Chalcides chalcides, Chalcides minutus and Chalcides mauritanicus, Chalcides guentheri, Chalcides pseudostriatus and Chalcides striatus, and it seems to be closest to eastern specimens of Chalcides minutus rather than Chalcides chalcides.

Conservation
The Algerian three-toed skink is listed as least concern but is threatened by habitat loss caused by overgrazing  and the conversion of land to agricultural and urbanisation. It occurs in the Djurdjura National Park in Algeria but is not known to occur in any protected areas in Tunisia.

References

Skinks of Africa
Reptiles of North Africa
Chalcides
Reptiles described in 1954
Taxa named by Wolfgang Klausewitz
Taxonomy articles created by Polbot